"Mr. Cab Driver" is the third single released from Lenny Kravitz debut album, Let Love Rule. It was released in 1990.

Song information
Kravitz wrote the song after an altercation with a cab driver. Although the song deals with racism and discrimination, he wrote it with a sense of humor.

Music video
The black and white music video for Mr. Cab Driver, directed by Geoff Barish, features Kravitz in a similar situation of the song's topic. The music video was shot in the streets of New York City.

Track listing
 "Mr. Cab Driver" – 3:52
 "Blues for Sister Someone" (live – 03.1990 – Boston) – 3:33
 "Does Anybody Out There Even Care" – 3:59
 "Rosemary" (live – 12.12.1989 – Amsterdam) – 7:11

See also
Anti-racism

References

External links

1990 singles
Lenny Kravitz songs
Song recordings produced by Lenny Kravitz
Songs against racism and xenophobia
Songs written by Lenny Kravitz
1989 songs
Virgin Records singles